There are many interjections in the Latin language, though by their nature they are not often found in the formal register of written Classical Latin, being mostly attested in certain comedies, by playwrights such as Terence and Plautus, which are written in a style more similar to Vulgar Latin. Terms used to express surprise or attract attention include "heu!" or "eheu!" (alas!), more commonly "vae!" with the same meaning, "euge!" (hurrah!) and "amen!" (truly, let it be) borrowed from the Hebrew. Invocations of the lower gods are plenty; most commonly "Pol!" (by Pollux!) and "mehercle!" (my Hercules!) while the names of higher deities are less common.

References
Aulus Gellius, Noctes Atticae, Liber XI:VI "III. Cur autem viri Castorem iurantes non appellaverint, non facile dictu est. Nusquam igitur scriptum invenire est apud idoneos quidem scriptores aut "mehercle" feminam dicere aut "mecastor" virum; 
IV. "edepol" autem, quod iusiurandum per Pollucem est, et viro et feminae commune est. 
V. Sed M. Varro adseverat antiquissimos viros neque per Castorem neque per Pollucem deiurare solitos, sed id iusiurandum fuisse tantum feminarum ex initiis Eleusinis acceptum; 
VI. paulatim tamen inscitia antiquitatis viros dicere "edepol" coepisse factumque esse ita dicendi morem, sed "mecastor" a viro dici in nullo vetere scripto inveniri."
https://la.wikisource.org/wiki/Noctes_Atticae/Liber_XI

Parts of speech
Interjections
Latin language